This is a list of events in South African sport in 1999.

Football (Rugby Union)
 19 June - South Africa (Springboks) beats  Italy 101-0

Football (Soccer)
 10 April - South Africa's national soccer team, Bafana Bafana loses 1 - 0 against Gabon at the Odi stadium in an African Nations Cup qualifier game 
 5 June - Bafana Bafana beats Mauritius 2-0 in a home game
 27 November - Bafana Bafana beats Sweden 1-0 in the Nelson Mandela Challenge held in Loftus Versfeld Stadium, Pretoria

See also
1998 in South African sport
1999 in South Africa
2000 in South African sport 
List of years in South African sport

 
South Africa